The National Women Football Championship is the top cup competition for women's football clubs in Pakistan – designed as an equivalent to the National Challenge Cup for men. It was started in 2005 by the Pakistan Football Federation. 

Young Rising Stars has been the most successful team in the history of he competition, winning it five times (including four consecutive wins from 2010 to 2013). WAPDA has had the most final appearances (7), winning once and losing six times. The most recent champion is Pakistan Army, which defended its 2018 title in 2019-20.

History
The first edition was held in 2005, organised by Pakistan Football Federation (PFF).

On 4th August 2010, Pakistan Football Federation President Faisal Saleh Hayat dedicated the Best Player Award of the National Women Football Championship to Misha Dawood, the late Diya W.F.C. midfielder. Misha had been on the ill-fated Airblue Flight 202 which crashed in the Margalla Hills on 28 July 2010.

Due to the political and judicial crisis of 2015 at the PFF, the championship was not held from 2015 to 2018.

The 2021 edition was cancelled, no official reason was given, but the decision took place after the Pakistan Football Federation's office was attacked and people inside held hostage by its former president, Syed Ashfaq Hussain Shah, and his group. The championship was interrupted before the knockout stage started.

Format
The number of teams participating has varied through the years. In the first edition, 8 teams took part. In the 2018 edition, 16 teams participated in the tournament, with three departmental teams, four provincial teams, four regional teams and five club teams, divided into four groups, winner of each group will earn a spot in semi-finals.

For the 2021 competition, 20 teams divided into four groups were originally supposed to participate in 59 scheduled matches, but one of them withdrew before the tournament commenced.

Tournament summary

List of finals 

 g Guest teams invited by Pakistan Football Federation, Afghanistan represented Afghanistan and Malavan BA represented Iran.

Performance by club

 g Guest teams invited by Pakistan Football Federation, Afghanistan represented Afghanistan and Malavan BA represented Iran.

See also 
 Football in Pakistan
 Sport in Pakistan
 AFC Women's Club Championship

References

External links

Pakistan Football Federation official website
Football Pakistan
National Women Championship

National Women Football Championship
Women
Pakistan
Women's sports leagues in Pakistan
Sports leagues established in 2005
2005 establishments in Pakistan